The 2008 Women's Junior South American Volleyball Championship was the 19th edition of the tournament, organised by South America's governing volleyball body, the Confederación Sudamericana de Voleibol (CSV). It was held in Chosica and Callao, Lima, Peru.

Competing nations
The following national teams qualified, they were seeded according to how they finished in the previous edition of the tournament:

First round
All times are Peruvian Standard Time (UTC-5)

Pool A

|}

|}

Pool B

|}

|}

Final round

Championship

Semifinals

|}

Seventh place match

|}

Fifth place match

|}

Third place match

|}

First place match

|}

Final standing

Individual awards

 Most Valuable Player
 
 Best Spiker
 
 Best Blocker
 
 Best Server
 

 Best Setter
 
 Best Digger
 
 Best Receiver
 
 Best Libero

References

External links
CSV official website

Women's South American Volleyball Championships
S
Volleyball
V
Youth volleyball